Carvalhoi may refer to:

 Aechmea carvalhoi, a Bromeliaceae species endemic to Brazil
 Amphisbaena carvalhoi, a worm lizard species found in Brazil
 Bokermannohyla carvalhoi, a species of frog in the family Hylidae, endemic to Brazil
 Chiasmocleis carvalhoi, a frog species endemic to Brazil
 Colobosauroides carvalhoi, a lizard species in the genus Colobosauroides
 Cycloramphus carvalhoi, a frog species endemic to Brazil
 Dendrophryniscus carvalhoi, a toad species endemic to Brazil
 Diplopterys carvalhoi, a plant species in the genus Diplopterys
 Harttia carvalhoi, a species of armored catfish endemic to Brazil where it is found in the Paquequer River basin
 Odontophrynus carvalhoi, a species of frog in the family Leptodactylidae, endemic to Brazil
 Pipa carvalhoi, the Carvalho's Surinam toad, a frog species endemic to Brazil
 Pristimantis carvalhoi, an amphibian species in the genus Pristimantis found in Brazil
 Syncope carvalhoi, a species of frog in the family Microhylidae, found in Colombia, Peru, and possibly Brazil
 Wittmackia carvalhoi, a species in the genus Wittmackia, endemic to Brazil
 Zachaenus carvalhoi, a species of frog in the family Leptodactylidae, endemic to Brazil

See also 
 Carvalho